İskender Başlakov (born 7 February 1990) is a Turkish swimmer. He competed in the men's 50 metre backstroke event at the 2018 FINA World Swimming Championships (25 m), in Hangzhou, China.

References

1990 births
Living people
Turkish male backstroke swimmers
Place of birth missing (living people)
Swimmers at the 2013 Mediterranean Games
Swimmers at the 2018 Mediterranean Games
Mediterranean Games silver medalists for Turkey
Mediterranean Games bronze medalists for Turkey
Mediterranean Games medalists in swimming
Islamic Solidarity Games competitors for Turkey
Islamic Solidarity Games medalists in swimming
21st-century Turkish people